C.A. Fénix may refer to:
Centro Atlético Fénix, Uruguayan football club
Club Atlético Fénix, Argentine football club